Madison Reed is an American brand of hair care and hair color products. The company has a subscription-based service through its online store as well as partnerships with Ulta, Sephora and QVC, among others. Madison Reed was founded in 2013 by Amy Errett and is headquartered in San Francisco.

Background

In 2017, Madison Reed opened brick-and-mortar "Color Bars" in San Francisco and New York City for root touch-ups and glosses. Errett was named one of Inc.'s Female Founders 100 list in 2018. Madison Reed announced that it would begin using "raw photography" in all advertising imagery, signified with a "Real Mark".  The company uses natural ingredients, such as argan oil and ginseng root extract, in its products, which are tested on human hair before going into production. It uses an algorithm that identifies a preferred hair color for customers based on answers to 12 questions about their hair. In 2016, Madison Reed released visualization tools such as a chatbot that analyzes primary and secondary tones to customize a customer's dye, and an augmented reality tool that uses a customer's smart phone or laptop camera to simulate a new hair color.  The color ingredient used by Madison Reed products is made in Italy.

In 2019, Madison Reed announced plans to expand to over 1,200 Ulta Beauty stores by the end of the year.

References

External links
Official Website

2013 establishments in California
Cosmetics brands
Hair care products
Hair coloring
Cosmetics companies of the United States